The Australasian United Steam Navigation Company (AUSNC) was an Australian shipping company formed in 1887 by the merger of the Australasian Steam Navigation Company and the Queensland Steam Shipping Company and their fleets. It existed from 1887 to 1961.

One of their former shipping offices, Naldham House, at 193 Mary Street, Brisbane, Queensland is listed in the Queensland Heritage Register.

Ships
The ships operated by the company included , which operated the mail service between Brisbane, Gladstone and Townsville. She was partly scrapped in 1926 and abandoned on Bishop Island at the mouth of the Brisbane River.

References

External links

Transport companies disestablished in 1961
Defunct shipping companies of Australia
Transport in Australia
Transport companies established in 1887
1887 establishments in Australia
1961 disestablishments in Australia